Jabez Comstock Knight (July 31, 1815 – April 6, 1900) was mayor of Providence, Rhode Island for five terms, 1859-1864.

Early life 
Knight was born in Centerville, Rhode Island. His family moved to Providence in 1830, when he was 15. He was employed by cotton merchants Orray Taft & Co.

Career 
He became Paymaster General for Rhode Island for 24 years, and was on the board of trustees of the Providence Reform School He was a trustee of Butler Hospital for 35 years. Knight was a member of the Providence Common Council, representing the Fourth Ward, 1849-1852. He was elected to the Providence Board of Aldermen for the Sixth Ward, 1854-1858.

Mayor
In May 1859 Knight ran for mayor against a Democratic opponent. He won  1,835 votes to 1,100. He then ran four more times unopposed, then declined nomination for a sixth term.

As Mayor, Knight demolished the Town House on Benefit Street that served as police station, and opened a new Central Police Station on Canal Street in April 1861. Knight introduced horse-drawn streetcars in Providence in 1863.

Knight served as mayor during the Civil War. During this time Providence industries provided uniforms, blankets, biscuits, rifles, and tools to the Union war effort.

Personal life
Knight married Catherine A. Taft on September 28, 1842 and had three daughters.

In the 1880s, Ex-Mayor Knight spent his summers at a cottage in Newport, Rhode Island, on Bellevue Avenue.

Knight died on April 6, 1904 and is buried at Swan Point Cemetery.

References

External links
 Biography of Knight at Providence City Hall
 Knight at Providence City website
 

1900 deaths
1815 births
Mayors of Providence, Rhode Island
Burials at Swan Point Cemetery
Rhode Island Republicans
Providence City Council members
19th-century American politicians